Anderson Souza Ferreira (born 9 May 1985), also known as Anderson, is a former footballer who played as a defender. Born in Brazil, he has played for the Equatorial Guinea national team.

Biography 
Anderson was born in Itabuna, a city located in the Brazilian state of Bahia.

International career
Anderson was one of the Brazilian-born naturalized Equatoguinean players by the Brazilian Antônio Dumas (Equatorial Guinea's former coach). Through his naturalization, he has been an international for the Equatoguinean national team on 25 March 2007. He played in an Africa Cup of Nations 2007 Qualifying match against Rwanda, in Malabo, a game which the national team won 3–1. Also he was called for other Africa Cup of Nations 2015 Qualifying match, against Rwanda in Kigali on 2 June 2007.

References

1985 births
Living people
Sportspeople from Bahia
Naturalized citizens of Equatorial Guinea
Equatoguinean footballers
Equatorial Guinea international footballers
Brazilian footballers
Equatoguinean people of Brazilian descent
Equatoguinean expatriate footballers
Esporte Clube Vitória players
Treze Futebol Clube players
Galícia Esporte Clube players
Association football defenders